The 1940–1941 SM-sarja season was played between 8 teams from 4 cities. Each team played 7 games.

SM-Sarja championship 

KIF Wins the 1940–1941 SM-sarja championship.

References
 Hockey Archives

Liiga seasons
Fin
1940–41 in Finnish ice hockey